The list of people from Overland Park, Kansas includes those who were born in or have lived in the city.

Arts and entertainment

Beauty and fashion
 Deborah Bryant, Miss America 1966
 Lisa Forbes (1981– ), Miss Kansas USA 2004
 Tara Dawn Holland (1972– ), Miss America 1997

Film, television, and theater
 Michael Almereyda (1960– ), film director, screenwriter
 Darren Lynn Bousman (1979– ), film director, screenwriter
 David Dastmalchian (1984– ), actor
 Tom Kane (1962– ), voice actor
 Sarah Lancaster (1980– ), actress
 John Lehr (1967– ), actor
 Rob Riggle (1970– ), actor, comedian
 Paul Rudd (1969– ), actor, screenwriter, director.
 Jason Sudeikis (1975– ), actor, comedian

Music
 Phillip Sandifer (1959– ), songwriter, recording artist
 Lajon Witherspoon (1972– ), lead singer of Sevendust

Other visual arts
 Elmo Gideon (1924–2010), painter, sculptor

Business
 William B. Strang Jr. (1857–1921), railroad magnate, city founder

Politics

 Jeff Colyer (1960– ), Governor of Kansas (2018–2019 ), 49th Lieutenant Governor of Kansas (2011–2018)
 Tim Kaine, United States Senator from Virginia, former Governor of Virginia
 Jason Kander, Missouri Secretary of State (2013–2017)
 Kris Kobach (1966– ), Kansas Secretary of State (2011–2019)
 Jan Meyers (1928– ), U.S. Representative from Kansas (1985-1997)
 Bradley Schlozman (1971– ), U.S. Attorney
 Kevin Yoder (1976– ), U.S. Representative from Kansas (2011-2019)

Religion
 James D. Conley (1955– ), Roman Catholic prelate
Jerry Johnston (1959– ), Southern Baptist Convention evangelist; pastor from 1996 to 2011 of the former First Family Church in Overland Park; reared in Overland Park

Sports

American football

 Andrew Gachkar (1988– ), linebacker
 Rudy Niswanger (1982– ), center
 Will Shields (1971– ), guard
 Lawrence Tynes (1978– ), placekicker
 Jeff Wolfert (1985– ), placekicker

Baseball
 Jason Adam (1991– ), pitcher
 Jason Grimsley (1967– ), pitcher
 Colton Murray (1990– ), pitcher
 Ryne Stanek (1991– ), pitcher
 Tom Burgmeier (1943– ), pitcher
 Mike Boddicker (1957– ), pitcher

Soccer
 Matt Besler (1987– ), defender
 Andy Gruenebaum (1982– ), goalkeeper
 Will John (1985– ), forward, midfielder
Peter Vermes (1966– ), head coach for Sporting Kansas City, former Wizards player

Other sports
 Christie Ambrosi (1976– ), 2000 Olympic U.S. softball player
 Anna Glennon (1996– ), World Champion Jet Ski racer
 Tyler Kalinoski (1992– ), basketball player
 Tonya Knight (1966– ), IFBB professional bodybuilder
 Semi Ojeleye (1994– ), basketball player
 Jack Sock (1992– ), professional tennis player
 Johnathan Wendel (1981– ), former professional Quake and Painkiller player
 Leanne Wong (2003– ), artistic gymnast

See also
 Lists of people from Kansas
 List of people from Johnson County, Kansas

References

Overland Park, Kansas
Overland Park